"Music is Power" is a song by English singer-songwriter Richard Ashcroft, the second track on his third studio album, Keys to the World (2006). The song features a sample from Walter Jackson's "It's All Over", written by Curtis Mayfield. It was released as the second single from that album on 17 April 2006, peaking at  20 in the UK Singles Chart on 23 April.

Track listings
 7-inch and CD (R6688; CDR6688)
 "Music Is Power" – 4:01
 "Long Way Down" – 5:42

 DVD (DVDR6688)
 "Music Is Power" – 3:55
 "Break the Night with Colour" (live at London's Kings College) – 5:24
 "Music Is Power" (live at London's Kings College) – 5:20
 "Music Is Power" (video) – 3:55
 "Music Is Power" (making of the video) – 2:00

References

2006 singles
2006 songs
Parlophone singles
Richard Ashcroft songs
Song recordings produced by Chris Potter (record producer)